Georgian-Greek relations are foreign relations between Georgia and Greece. Both countries established embassy level diplomatic relations on April 20, 1992. Greeks have been present in Georgia since antiquity. Also Greece  recognizes Abkhazia as a part of Georgia. There were Greek colonies in present-day Georgia during ancient history.

There are between 15,000 and 25,000 Pontic Greeks in Georgia, although there are significantly fewer than there had been until the early 1990s, when many Georgian Greeks began to emigrate to Greece or southern Russia.

There were around 27,400 ethnic Georgians in Greece . Most of them reside in Athens, Thessaloniki and the island of Crete.

Diplomacy

Republic of Georgia
Athens (Embassy)

Republic of Greece
Tbilisi (Embassy)

See also
Foreign relations of Georgia
Foreign relations of Greece 
Georgia–EU relations
Greeks in Georgia

References

External links
 Georgia Ministry of Foreign Affaires about the relation with Greece
  Georgian embassy in Athens
 Greek Ministry of Foreign Affaires about the relation with Georgia
 Greek embassy in Tbilisi

 
Greece
Georgia (country)